Marvel Unlimited, formerly known as Marvel Digital Comics Unlimited, is an online service by Marvel Comics that distributes past issues of their comics via the internet. The service launched on November 13, 2007, and now has more than 30,000 comic book issues in its archive.

History
Marvel first began releasing comics over the internet in 1996 with Marvel CyberComics. This was later replaced by DotComics under the tenure of Bill Jemas. This would grow to a size of dozens of comics by 2002, but would later be limited to a mere 12 comics by 2004.

Marvel Digital Comics was first announced in 2005 as a replacement to its DotComics; however, it utilized the same Flash-based interface with only minor updates, while decreasing the comics available from 12 issues to 4 issues. At this time, Editor-in-chief Joe Quesada speculated on the possibilities of adding animation to the comics, which would be realized in 2009 with the release of Spider-Woman as a motion comic.

Marvel's Digital Comics only grew modestly, reaching over 24 comics in April 2006 until finally it relaunched in November 2007 as Marvel Digital Comics Unlimited. Unlike earlier initiatives, Marvel Digital Comics Unlimited was a subscription service with over 2,500 comics available to subscribers, with new comics added on a weekly basis. A small portion of the library was made available for free in an attempt to entice viewers to subscribe to the service through either its monthly or yearly plans.

In response to fears from comic sellers, Dan Buckley promised that there would be at least a six-month delay from when a comic is published in print and when it is made available on Marvel's Digital Comics Unlimited. However Marvel Comics modified this policy in 2008 with the release of Secret Invasion: Home Invasion. This was released online first as a tie-in with the Secret Invasion event. Digital comic exclusives would be broadened to include non-event comics. The initial release of exclusives included a Fin Fang Four story by Scott Gray and Roger Langridge, Marvels Channel: Monsters, Myths and Marvels by Frank Tieri and Juan Santacruz, American Eagle: Just a Little Old-Fashioned Justice by Jason Aaron and Kid Colt by Tom DeFalco.

On October 13, 2009, Marvel launched an upgraded version of the comic viewer, dubbed the Marvel Digital Comics Unlimited Reader 3.0. The new digital comics reader added a number of new features including full screen mode, thumbnails for all pages, and easier ways of finding books related to the one being read.

It then published a daily series of "lost" Captain America comic strips that were actually modern creations written by Karl Kesel. A three-part Galacta story was also published digitally following it winning the vote to see which was the most popular story in Marvel Assistant-Sized Spectacular.

In March 2013, Marvel announced that the service would be renamed from Marvel Digital Comics Unlimited to Marvel Unlimited, and that the service would expand to iOS devices.

On October 19, 2020, Marvel announced the six-month release delay would be shortened to only three months with over 28,000 Marvel comics available on the service.

Marvel's Infinity Comics  

Marvel's Infinity Comics were announced on September 9, 2021, which are digital comics exclusive to Marvel Unlimited. These comics release weekly and differ from the standard page turn by using a vertical scroll to advance reading. Infinity Comics launched with 27 series excusive to the service. In September 2022, Marvel announced that within one year "the Infinity Comics lineup has grown to over 350 issues".

Graeme McMillan, for Polygon in September 2021, wrote that "given the fact that the Infinity Comics eschew the traditional digital comics page for the vertical scroll format popularized by incredibly success webcomic platform Webtoon, it's likely that Marvel and parent company Disney are also looking to attract an established comics audience that has so far stayed away from Spider-Man's friendly neighborhood—Webtoon has more than 15 million readers daily, a number that significantly dwarfs Marvel's own fanbase in terms of its comics output". McMillan called the launch a "mixed bag" in terms of the quality of the various series with It's Jeff! the standout title. McMillan commented that "if Marvel sticks with the program, there's the potential for some great work down the line—once everyone has figured out just how to make it all work". It's Jeff! went on to be nominated for Best Digital Comic at the 2022 Eisner Awards; it was the only Infinity Comic to be nominated. 

In July 2022, Bloomberg reported that "Infinity Comics titles break into the top 10 of most read issues on Marvel Unlimited, which has over 30,000 comics, on a daily basis" and that C.B. Cebulski, editor in chief of Marvel Comics, "says that Infinity Comics help broaden Marvel’s audience to a generation that consumes everything on screens". Also in July 2022, The New York Times highlighted that Marvel was one of the older brands "experimenting with online offerings. Marvel has developed its own 'digital first' stories, including its Infinity Comics, which uses a vertical scroll. [...] Executives at Marvel said they plan to expand Infinity Comics with a focus on creators and characters from diverse backgrounds, which the company hopes will help reach new readers".

Nicholas Brooks, for CBR in August 2022, highlighted that Marvel Unlimited is "offering readers a new era of funny comics" and breathing "new life" into the comedy comics "genre by way of their Infinity Comics. [...] Thanks to Marvel Unlimited's efforts to venture into comedy comics, the subscription service has offered a much-needed change of pace for the company overall. While these characters may not necessarily fly off the shelves, that doesn't mean they lack the substance to entertain and become fan favorites in their own right. These new Infinity Comics allow fans to take a breather from the world-breaking stakes of superhero comics and enjoy a bit of good old-fashioned humor". Colin Mooney, also for CBR in August 2022, commented that Infinity Comics "don't tend to get much attention from comic book fans en masse", however, the Marvel Voices: Young Avengers Infinity Comic "is a comic that deserves attention: despite being limited by its scope, this comic packs in a lot of content for which Young Avengers fans have been waiting".

Other Marvel digital comics outlets
Unlike Marvel Unlimited, these comics are available for purchase as single issues. In addition, it was announced in August 2009 that Marvel's comics would be released for the PlayStation Portable in December 2009.

See also

 DC Universe Infinite

References

External links
 

Marvel Entertainment
Marvel Comics
American webcomics
Webcomic syndicates
Subscription services
Internet properties established in 2007
2007 in comics